Cinderella is a Disney franchise that commenced in 1950 with the theatrical release of the 1950 film Cinderella. The series' protagonist is Cinderella, who was based on the character of the same name from the Cinderella fairy tale. The Disney film's character was originally voiced by American singer and actress Ilene Woods.

Overview 
MCNG Marketing wrote "Cinderella alone is a brand that is easily worth hundreds of million of "bippity boppity" dollars." The blog Fragments said "Cinderella seems to be the main princess in the Disney Princess franchise–there are 108 items for Cinderella on DisneyStore.com ... Cinderella is the alpha-princess of the Disney Princess franchise, which seems a bit odd since she is from the second-oldest film that is included in the franchise."

The paper Saving Cinderella: From Disney to Cyborg Princess examines why Cinderella is such an enduring franchise:

Animated films

Cinderella (1950) 

Cinderella is a 1950 American animated romantic musical fantasy film produced by Walt Disney and released by RKO Radio Pictures. Based on the fairy tale Cendrillon by Charles Perrault, it is the 12th Disney animated feature film, and was released on February 15, 1950. Directing credits go to Clyde Geronimi, Hamilton Luske and Wilfred Jackson. Songs were written by Mack David, Jerry Livingston, and Al Hoffman. Songs in the film include "A Dream Is a Wish Your Heart Makes", "Bibbidi-Bobbidi-Boo", "So This Is Love", "The Work Song" and "Sing, Sweet Nightingale". In 2018, Cinderella was selected for preservation in the United States National Film Registry by the Library of Congress as being "culturally, historically, or aesthetically significant".

With a wicked stepmother and two jealous stepsisters who keep her enslaved and in rags, Cinderella stands no chance of attending the royal ball. When her fairy godmother appears and magically transforms her reality into a dream come true, Cinderella enchants the handsome Prince Charming at the ball, but must face the wrath of her enraged stepmother and sisters when the spell wears off at midnight.

Cinderella II: Dreams Come True 

Cinderella II: Dreams Come True is a 2002 American animated romantic musical fantasy film, the first direct-to-video sequel to the 1950 American romantic musical film Cinderella. It was made in 2001 and released on February 26, 2002. It was followed by Cinderella III: A Twist in Time in 2007. It consists of three segments featuring Cinderella planning a party, Jaq the mouse being turned into a human and living as Cinderella's page boy, and one of Cinderella's brutal stepsisters (Anastasia, the redheaded one in a pink dress) reaching her redemption through falling in love with a young baker, a low-class man of whom Lady Tremaine and Drizella do not approve. Estimated to cost $5 million, Cinderella II: Dreams Come True was Walt Disney Pictures' top selling animated sequel that year, grossing approximately $120 million in direct-to-video sales, but the film itself was met with a mainly negative response from fans and critics alike.

Cinderella prepares for her first royal ball and tries to help her stepsister find love.

Cinderella III: A Twist in Time 

Cinderella III: A Twist in Time is a 2007 American animated musical fantasy film, the second direct-to-video sequel to the 1950 American romantic musical film Cinderella. Canonically it is a continuation of the original Cinderella, rather than Cinderella II: Dreams Come True, though due to its unusual chronological sequencing it acknowledges the events of Cinderella II: Dreams Come True by using some of its characters. The film was released on February 6, 2007, directed by Frank Nissen and features the voices of Jennifer Hale and Susanne Blakeslee. For the UK release of the film, it was simply titled "Cinderella: A Twist in Time", without mention of it being a sequel. It made its world television premiere on Toon Disney on December 3, 2007.

On the first anniversary of Cinderella's marriage to Prince Charming, her stepsister Anastasia finds the Fairy Godmother's wand in the forest. Cinderella's cruel stepmother, Lady Tremaine, uses it to reverse time, making the famous glass slipper fit Anastasia's foot before Cinderella has a chance to try it on. No longer retaining any memory of who Cinderella is, the prince prepares to marry Anastasia, and Cinderella is forced to jump into action to regain her happy ending.

Live-action film 

Cinderella is an American romantic fantasy film directed by Kenneth Branagh from a screenplay written by Aline Brosh McKenna and Chris Weitz. Produced by David Barron and Simon Kinberg for Walt Disney Pictures, the film is inspired by the folk tale Cinderella by Charles Perrault and the 1950 American romantic musical film of the same name. It stars Lily James as the titular character, Cate Blanchett as Lady Tremaine, Richard Madden as Prince Kit, Sophie McShera as Drisella Tremaine, Holliday Grainger as Anastasia Tremaine and Helena Bonham Carter as The Fairy Godmother. Principal photography on the film began on September 23, 2013 in London. The film was released on March 13, 2015.

After her father unexpectedly dies, young Ella finds herself at the mercy of her cruel stepmother and stepsisters, who reduce her to scullery maid. Despite her circumstances, she refuses to despair. An invitation to a palace ball gives Ella hope that she might reunite with the dashing stranger she met in the woods, but her stepmother prevents her from going. Help arrives in the form of a kindly beggar woman who has a magic touch for ordinary things.

Theme park attractions

Cinderella Castle 

Cinderella Castle is the fairy tale castle at the center of two Disney theme parks: the Magic Kingdom at the Walt Disney World Resort, and Tokyo Disneyland at the Tokyo Disney Resort. Both serve as worldwide recognized icons and the flagship attraction for their respective theme parks. Along with Sleeping Beauty Castle, the Castle is an iconic symbol of The Walt Disney Company as a whole.

Prince Charming Regal Carrousel 

Prince Charming Regal Carrousel (formerly Cinderella's Golden Carrousel) is an authentic carousel ride in the Magic Kingdom at Walt Disney World Resort. Similar attractions under varying names can be found at two other Disney parks, including Tokyo Disneyland and Hong Kong Disneyland. This 90-horse carousel plays organ-based Disney songs during the two-minute ride period. Hand-painted scenes from Disney's Cinderella can be seen on the ride; hence the name "Prince Charming".

L'Auberge de Cendrillon 

L'Auberge de Cendrillon (French for Cinderella's Inn) is a restaurant located in Fantasyland in Disneyland Paris, which opened in 1992 with the park. It is themed to the Disney movie Cinderella.

Cinderella Castle Suite

Cinderella's Royal Table 
Cinderella's Royal Table is a restaurant "event" held daily within the Cinderella Castle's upper level at Disney World, Florida. While lunches are sometimes available, the primary meal served is Dinner. Reserved Guests are admitted to a waiting alcove before proceeding to a French-styled eating area with a number of coves, tables, and various Baroque props and chandeliers. Menus are provided for ordering a number of entrees, all of which are typically found in mid to upper level dining restaurants (beef and chicken tend to dominate). During the dinner, the Cinderella characters (usually Cinderella, Prince Charming and the Godmother) will circulate with and briefly chat with the guests, often posing for pictures. Reservations are required, and over the years wait times have ranged from two days to (for dinner) nearly 6 months.

Cinderella's Fairy Tale Hall

Stage musical

Disney's Cinderella KIDS 
Disney's Cinderella KIDS is a scaled-down stage musical version of the film known as Disney's Cinderella KIDS is frequently performed by schools and children's theaters.

Video games

Cinderella: Magical Dreams 
Cinderella: Magical Dreams is a video game based on the film of the same name. The game was released September 20, 2005.

Cinderella's Dollhouse 
Disney's Cinderella Dollhouse is a point-and-click computer game released by Disney Interactive in 2000.

Cinderella Dollhouse 2 
Cinderella Dollhouse 2 is a point-and-click computer game released by Disney Interactive in 2000.

Cinderella's Castle Designer 
Cinderella's Castle Designer is computer game that allows players to build the castles from 1950's Cinderella.

Disney Princess games 
Because Cinderella is a Disney Princess, there is an overlap between the Cinderella and Princess franchises. Disney Princess: Enchanting Storybooks is a video game based on the Disney Princess franchise, developed and published by THQ and was released for the Nintendo Wii and Nintendo DS on November 8, 2011. Disney Princess Cinderella is a 2003 adventure video game developed by Art Co., Ltd for the Game Boy Advance. The game has the princesses completing several levels. Disney Princess: Enchanted Journey is a 2007 video game released for PlayStation 2, Wii and PC.

Kingdom Hearts series 
Cinderella and Fairy Godmother appear in the first Kingdom Hearts video game. A world based on the film, Castle of Dreams, appears in Kingdom Hearts Birth by Sleep, in addition to them two also appearing Jaq, Lucifer, Prince Charming, Lady Tremaine, Anastasia, Drizella and the Grand Duke. Fairy Godmother returns in the Kingdom Hearts III DLC Kingdom Hearts III Re Mind.

Disney Magic Kingdoms 
Cinderella, Prince Charming, Fairy Godmother, Lady Tremaine, Anastasia and Drizella appear as playable characters in the video game Disney Magic Kingdoms.

Music

Soundtrack 
The soundtrack for Cinderella was first released by Walt Disney Records on February 4, 1997 and included a bonus demo. On October 4, 2005 Disney released a special edition of the soundtrack album of Cinderella, for the Platinum Edition DVD release, which includes several demo songs cut from the final film, a new song, and a cover version of "A Dream is a Wish Your Heart Makes".

References 

 
Mass media franchises introduced in 1950
Musical film series
Romance film series
American romantic musical films
Walt Disney Studios (division) franchises
Fantasy film franchises
Films based on Cinderella